John Thomas Copenhaver Jr. (born September 29, 1925) is a senior United States district judge of the United States District Court for the Southern District of West Virginia. Copenhaver was the last actively serving district judge appointed by President Gerald Ford.

Education and career

Copenhaver was born in Charleston, West Virginia. He received an Artium Baccalaureus degree from West Virginia University in 1947 and a Bachelor of Laws from West Virginia University College of Law in 1950. He was in the United States Army from 1944 to 1946, and became a law clerk to Judge Ben Moore of the United States District Court for the Southern District of West Virginia from 1950 to 1951. He was in private practice in Charleston from 1951 to 1958, and a referee in bankruptcy for the Southern District of West Virginia from 1958 to 1973. Copenhaver was both an adjunct professor at the West Virginia University College of Law and a faculty member of the Federal Judicial Center from 1970 to 1976, and a United States Bankruptcy Judge for the Southern District of West Virginia from 1973 to 1976.

Federal judicial service

Copenhaver was nominated by President Gerald Ford on August 26, 1976 to be a federal judge of the United States District Court for the Southern District of West Virginia, to a seat vacated by Judge Kenneth Keller Hall. He was confirmed by the United States Senate on September 1, 1976, and received his commission two days later. He assumed senior status on November 1, 2018.

See also
List of United States federal judges by longevity of service

References

Sources
 
 Political Graveyard

1925 births
Living people
Judges of the United States District Court for the Southern District of West Virginia
United States district court judges appointed by Gerald Ford
20th-century American judges
West Virginia University alumni
West Virginia University College of Law faculty
West Virginia University College of Law alumni
Judges of the United States bankruptcy courts
Lawyers from Charleston, West Virginia
Military personnel from West Virginia
United States Army personnel of World War II
21st-century American judges
20th-century American lawyers